The Evangelical Lutheran Church in Sweden, (Swedish, Evangelisk-lutherska kyrkan i Sverige) is a confessional Lutheran denomination in Sweden. The church was founded in 1968 by the Evangelical Lutheran Church of St. Martin, who had left the Church of Sweden in 1961. It is the oldest confessional Lutheran church in Sweden outside the Church of Sweden. Membership is around 30.

External links
Evangelical Lutheran Church of Sweden website

Lutheran denominations
Lutheranism in Sweden
1968 establishments in Sweden
Christian organizations established in 1968
Christian denominations in Sweden